The Canon de 75 modèle 1905 à tir rapide (abbreviated to Canon de 75 mle TR) was a field gun used by Belgium during World War I and World War II. 

It was a license-built copy of the Krupp 7.5 cm Model 1903. Production continued during World War I until the Germans overran the factory in 1914. 

After 1940, the Wehrmacht designated this as the 7.5 cm FK 235(b), armed occupation forces in Belgium with them and handed some over to the Hungarians.

Notes

References
 Chamberlain, Peter & Gander, Terry. Light and Medium Field Artillery. New York: Arco, 1975
 Gander, Terry and Chamberlain, Peter. Weapons of the Third Reich: An Encyclopedic Survey of All Small Arms, Artillery and Special Weapons of the German Land Forces 1939-1945. New York: Doubleday, 1979

External links

 Canon de 75 mle TR on Landships
 75 MM CALIBRE CARTRIDGES

World War II field artillery
World War II artillery of Belgium
World War I guns
75 mm artillery